Jagananna Ammavodi is a program launched by the Government of Andhra Pradesh to encourage parents to send their children to school by depositing ₹13,000 rupees of financial assistance in the bank account of student's mother.

Development 
Jagananna Ammavodi was launched by Chief minister of Andhra Pradesh Y. S. Jagan Mohan Reddy on 9 January 2020 with a budget of ₹ 6,455.80 crore for the academic year 2019–20. The scheme benefits students of around 43 lakh households. Second phase of the scheme was launched on 11th Jan 2021 with a budget of ₹6673 crore benefiting 45 lakh people. The initial eligibility criteria which included 75% of mandatory attendance was relaxed due to COVID-19 pandemic.

The scheme 
Under the scheme, an amount of ₹15,000 is deposited into the bank account of beneficiary's mother.

Students studying in all the government, private aided, private unaided and residential schools/junior colleges are eligible to avail the scheme whereas dropouts, income tax payers and government employees have been considered ineligible.

References 

2020 establishments in Andhra Pradesh
Education in Andhra Pradesh
Government welfare schemes in Andhra Pradesh